Activation products are materials made radioactive by neutron activation.

Fission products and actinides produced by neutron absorption of nuclear fuel itself are normally referred to by those specific names, and activation product reserved for products of neutron capture by other materials, such as structural components of the nuclear reactor or nuclear bomb, the reactor coolant, control rods or other neutron poisons, or materials in the environment. All of these, however, need to be handled as radioactive waste. Some nuclides originate in more than one way, as activation products or fission products.

Activation products in a reactor's primary coolant loop are a main reason reactors use a chain of two or even three coolant loops linked by heat exchangers.

Fusion reactors will not produce radioactive waste from the fusion product nuclei themselves, which are normally just helium-4, but generate high neutron fluxes, so activation products are a particular concern.

Activation product radionuclides include:

[1] Branching fractions from LNHB database.

[2] Branching fractions renormalised to sum to 1.0..

References

External links
 Handbook on Nuclear Activation Cross-Sections, IAEA, 1974
 Nuclear Structure and Decay Databases (nndc.bnl.gov)
 New and revised half-life measurements results made by the Radioactivity Group of NIST
 HANDBOOK OF NUCLEAR DATA FOR SAFEGUARDS: DATABASE EXTENSIONS, AUGUST 2008

Radiation
Neutron
Radiation effects
Nuclear materials